Christopher Coover (April 3, 1950 – April 3, 2022) was an American antiquarian book expert. He worked for Christie's in New York City for 35 years. He also was an appraiser on Antiques Roadshow.

References

External links
Christopher Coover collection of literary & historical letters manuscripts and documents, 1589-1923 | Rare Book & Manuscript Library | Columbia University Libraries Finding Aids

1950 births
2022 deaths
Businesspeople from New York City